KRNI (1010 AM) is a radio station licensed to Mason City, Iowa, United States. The station is owned by the University of Northern Iowa (UNI). KRNI is part of Iowa Public Radio and carries the network's "News and Information" service.

KRNI was established as KSMN, the second local station in Mason City, in 1948. KSMN provided news and, ultimately, country music until it was switched to a simulcast of KLSS (106.1 FM), the FM station previously started by KSMN, in 1985. When the owners of KLSS-AM-FM acquired another AM station in 1990, this station was divested and donated to UNI.

History

Establishment and early years
The Mohawk Broadcasting Company, led by Robert Carson, incorporated in 1947 and filed for and received a construction permit from the Federal Communications Commission (FCC) to build a new radio station on 1010 kHz, to operate with 1,000 watts during daytime hours only, on October 30. Building work began before year's end at a former schoolhouse three miles east of town on U.S. Route 18, and KSMN made its debut on March 1 of that year. The call letters were said to stand for "Komplete Sports Music News". The station suffered a devastating fire to its transmitter site, causing $35,000 in damage, on the night of January 29, 1951; the heat was so intense that the keys melted off typewriters and the entire plant was a total loss, though the studios were not, having previously been moved to the Weir building in downtown Mason City. The station was back in service three days later thanks to emergency equipment provided by transmitter manufacturers and other Iowa radio stations.

In 1952, KSMN principals formed the Twin States Television Corporation. The group then filed for channel 3, which had been allotted to Mason City. This application, however, conflicted with one by Mason City station KGLO; Twin States withdrew its application in October 1953, allowing for the construction of KGLO-TV (now KIMT) on the channel.

Mohawk Broadcasting sold KSMN in 1956 to Land o' Corn Broadcasters, owned by Charles V. Warren, for $115,000. Warren then sold the company to Red Blanchard and Harry Campbell in 1959 for $140,000; by this time, KSMN had additional studios in Hampton and Clear Lake. While Blanchard moved to Mason City, he continued to host the weekly WGN Barn Dance show in Chicago, commuting 800 miles round-trip in his own aircraft each week; he noted that it only took him 30 minutes longer to get to the studio in Chicago than it did when he lived in Berwyn, Illinois, a Chicago suburb, and that he had fun making the journey.

Talley and Hedberg ownership
Blanchard and Campbell sold KSMN to Hayward Talley of Litchfield, Illinois, trading as the North Central Iowa Broadcasting Company, in 1963. The sale was made because of the increasing demands on Blanchard as an entertainer, with more public appearances and a planned color television broadcast of the Barn Dance. An editor's note in the Globe-Gazette newspaper accompanying an editorial written by Blanchard to bid the town farewell noted that he had become "one of Mason City's most popular personalities".

Under Talley, KSMN filed in 1966 to add an FM station; however, it could not build it at its AM transmitter site due to short-spacing to another station in Waterloo. The new station was approved in May 1967 and planned to broadcast KSMN during daytime hours while extending its service at night. KLSS (106.1 FM) debuted on November 1 of that year.

In 1984, Talley sold KSMN and KLSS to Hedberg Broadcasting of Blue Earth, Minnesota. KSMN initially retained its country music format, but on March 1, 1985, this was abandoned and KSMN switched to simulcasting KLSS and its adult contemporary format, also adopting the KLSS call letters.

Donation to public radio
In 1990, Hedberg Broadcasting reached a deal to buy KRIB (1490 AM) for $250,000. The deal was of special significance to the company, as company founder Paul Hedberg had worked at KRIB as a teenager in the late 1950s. FCC rules of the time did not permit ownership of multiple AM or FM stations in the same area, so KLSS AM had to be divested. It was donated to the University of Northern Iowa, which at the time had been providing a rebroadcast service of KHKE in Cedar Falls in the Mason City area via low-powered translator. Programming switched to a rebroadcast of KHKE in September 1990.

The transmitter, cited as having 10 years of service life remaining when Hedberg donated the facility to UNI, was replaced in 1999 using federal grant monies.

In 2004, the radio services of the University of Northern Iowa, Iowa State University, and the University of Iowa were amalgamated into Iowa Public Radio. KRNI was switched in 2011 to the all-news service of IPR.

References

External links
Iowa Public Radio

RNI
NPR member stations
Mason City, Iowa
1948 establishments in Iowa
Radio stations established in 1948
University of Northern Iowa